After Muhammad's death, the disputed question of who should be the successor (Caliph) to Muhammad's political authority led eventually to the division of Islam into Sunni and Shia.

Sunni's believe that he should be elected, whereas Shia believe in divinely ordained infallible twelve Shi'a Imams for leadership after Muhammad. The Ismaili Shia have their own version of the Imamah doctrine.

Originally, Shi'a belief was that they should refrain from politics in the absence of one of the twelve Shia Imams. But after The Occultation of the twelfth Shia Imam, the original Shia concept of leadership became untenable, so the notion of Guardianship of the Islamic Jurists (Velayat-e faqih) was derived by Ruhollah Khomeini.

See also
 Imamate in Shia doctrine

Islamic religious leaders
Leadership